AUF1 is an Austrian far-right online channel promoting fake news and political conspiracy theories. The channel was founded in June 2021 by Stephan Magnet and has an audience in Austria and Germany. In 2022, the Austrian media authority  initiated proceedings against AUF1.

History 
The main personnel of AUF1 had far-right activist backgrounds. Andreas Retschitzegger, the program manager for Germany, is also a former BfJ squad who was also active in the FPÖ youth organization .

Stefan Magnet founded the channel during the COVID-19 pandemic. On May 31, 2021, AUF1 went online for the first time with a contribution. The station is based in Austria but addresses the entire German-speaking counties. The ordinance has increased rapidly since the TV channel was founded so the station is at the End of 2022 now one of the largest "alternative media" for the COVID-denier movement (Querdenker) and the milieu of conspiracy ideology. In the summer of 2022 it became known that AUF1 wanted to set up a permanent editorial team in Berlin, which would be headed by Martin Müller-Mertens. Müller-Mertens was previously TV boss of the right-wing extremist German magazine "Compact". He said that the "focus of reporting is increasingly being shifted to Germany".

The Austrian media authority  announced in November 2022 that it had initiated proceedings concerning AUF1 on suspicion of broadcasting without a license. Komm Austria wrote that "content obviously designed by AUF1 is broadcast as part of the terrestrial RTV program in the Linz area". RTV is a local commercial Austria TV station. However, AUF1 probably never submitted a license application.

Program content 
The channel denies the danger of COVID-19 represents everything in this context as a conspiracy of an "elite" that is not described in detail. According to Magnet, Google, the World Economic Forum, the LGBTQI+ movement, and genetic engineers are all working to destroy humanity. 

Magnet promotes anti-semitic content via AUF1 and its Telegram channel. When the media reported about it, Magnet accused UNESCO, the EU Commission and the World Jewish Congress of a defamation campaign.

In line with its target audience, the station covers often statements from politicians from the German right-wing AfD party and reports on the AfD conventions.

AUF1 is sympathetic to Vladimir Putin's policies and justifies the 2022 Russian invasion of Ukraine. The station promotes Russian propaganda narratives.

Jan Rathje, senior researcher at the Center for Monitoring, Analysis and Strategy (CeMAS), said that the topics covered by AUF1 are part of major world conspiracy narratives. The channel says that everything is "part of a big conspiracy with the aim of wiping out the white population in Europe".

Financing 
According to experts, the program is produced at a relatively large financial expense. The presentation is professional. It is not publicly known where the money for the broadcaster's productions comes from. Officially, the station states that it is financed by donations. It also runs an "AUF1 shop" where, among other things, stickers with the inscription "No to compulsory vaccination" are offered. However, experts doubt that this is the only cash flow.

Network 
AUF1 broadcasts via live streams and YouTube. AUF1 runs a Telegram channel. In Austria, the local TV station RTV broadcasts programs of AUF1.

AUF1 is well connected to other right-wing media outlets, as part of what ORF described as the "Propaganda Cluster from Upper Austria". 

AUF1 is connected to "Info-DIREKT" and the newspaper "Wochenblick". Editor-in-chief of "Wochenblick", Elsa Mittmannsgruber, has her own program at AUF1. The channel is well-connected to the German far-right outlet "Compact".

References

External links 

 

2021 establishments in Austria
Anti-Islam sentiment in Germany
Anti-Islam sentiment in Austria
Climate change denial
Conservative media in the United States
Conspiracist media
Far-right politics in Germany
Far-right politics in Austria
German news websites
Austrian news websites
New Right (Europe)
Right-wing populism in Germany
Media of Neue Rechte